The Korea Times is a Korean language Monday-Saturday newspaper published in Los Angeles, California. It is the largest Korean language newspaper in the United States. It has bureaus in Los Angeles, New York, Washington, D.C., San Francisco, Chicago, Seattle, Atlanta, Philadelphia, Hawaii, Toronto, and Vancouver.

References

External links
Korea Times Official Website

Korean-American culture in California
Daily newspapers published in Greater Los Angeles
Non-English-language newspapers published in California
Korean-language newspapers published in the United States
Publications established in 1969